Rhodesian Air Services (RAS) was an airline from Southern Rhodesia (today's Zimbabwe, until 1963 part of the Federation of Rhodesia and Nyasaland) from 1960 to 1965. Formed by Jack Malloch and headquartered in Salisbury, it operated scheduled and chartered passenger flights on regional routes.

Route network
In 1965, RAS offered scheduled flights to the following destinations in Southern Rhodesia:
Bulawayo - Bulawayo Airport
Chiredzi - Buffalo Range Airport
Fort Victoria
Salisbury - Salisbury Airport (base)
Triangle

Fleet
Upon closure, the Rhodesian Air Services fleet consisted of the following aircraft:

Accidents and incidents
On 22 November 1961, a Rhodesian Air Services Douglas C-47 Skytrain (registered VP-YRX) crashed near Salisbury Airport, killing two of the three occupants that had intended to fly the aircraft to Livingstone. Shortly after take-off, an engine problem had been encountered, which the pilot had failed to address properly so that control was lost.

References

Airlines of Rhodesia
Airlines established in 1960
Airlines disestablished in 1965